Benwell is an area in the West End of Newcastle upon Tyne, England.

History

The place-name 'Benwell' is first attested in the Historia de Sancto Cuthberto circa 1050 AD, where it appears as Bynnewalle, from the Old English bionnan walle, meaning "inside the wall". This refers to Benwell's position relative to Hadrian's Wall (adjoining which was the Roman fort of Condercum, hence the modern Condercum Road nearby). The fort was covered over by subsequent development in the area, but the remains of a Roman temple can still be seen in the vicinity.  Benwell is situated between Hadrian's Wall to the north and the River Tyne to the south, and in medieval times it was part of the Barony of Bolbec.

By the 13th century the medieval manor of Benwell had been subdivided, originally into two, but then one of the halves was further subdivided. So, although people usually refer to the three sections of Benwell Manor as ‘thirds’, this gives a misleading impression, because one of the ‘thirds’ was larger and wealthier than the other two. This third belonged to the Scot family, who were wealthy merchants from Newcastle and by 1296 they were the principal taxpayers in Benwell. The Scot family later went on to create a deer park in 1367, which later became Scotswood.

In the 16th century Benwell village was arranged in two rows of houses on either side of a wide street or green. A plain oblong tower, three storeys high with battlements around the roof was also recorded as being built.

In 1540, the Crown, under King Henry VIII, took possession of Benwell Tower from Tynemouth Priory when it dissolved the monasteries.

Early in the 17th century, Benwell was split into smaller estates which were bought by the Shafto and Riddell families who were merchant families interested in exploiting the coal reserves on the banks of the Tyne.

Benwell Colliery was opened in 1766 and operated until 1938.

The original layout of Benwell exists in the form of Benwell Village, Benwell Lane, Ferguson's Lane and Fox and Hounds Lane; however, no buildings still exist other than from the early 19th century. The tower from the 16th century was rebuilt in the 18th century and then all traces were removed when the present hall, Benwell Towers was built in a Tudor style by John Dobson in 1831. Benwell Towers featured in the BBC television show Byker Grove.

By the 1990s, Benwell was widely regarded as one of the most troubled parts of Tyneside, if not the whole of Britain. In April 1994, The Independent reported that unemployment in the area stood at 24% (well over twice the national average) and that drug abuse and arson were both a major problem in the area, with a number of arson attacks known to have been carried out in an attempt to intimidate witnesses to crimes and deter them from giving evidence in court.

Much like similar parts of West Newcastle, since the 2010s, regeneration has been underway with new housing developments and improved community facilities across Benwell, including a 2000-home housing estate, The Rise, and improvements to Benwell's main shopping centres.

Governance
The area is represented on Newcastle City Council as part of the Benwell and Scotswood ward, with three Labour councillors, including Jeremy Beecham, the former chairman of the Labour Party and the Local Government Association. He was first elected for Benwell in 1967.

Famous residents and facts

Joe Laws is a British professional boxer, known for his outspoken personality and his popularity with his hometown fans.
Alan Robson MBE (born 1 October 1955) is a British radio presenter who presented the late night phone-in show, NightOwls on Metro Radio, a local commercial station in the North East
Richard Grainger who built the markets, The Monument, Grainger Street, Theatre Royal and Grey Street is buried in St James' Churchyard in Benwell.
Dorothy Liddell, noted archaeologist, was born in Benwell.
John Aidan Liddell, VC, MC, Captain Princess Louise’s Argyll and Sutherland Highlanders; pilot 7 Squadron Royal Flying Corps; brother to Dorothy; recipient of Victoria Cross, flying reconnaissance near Ostend, 31 July 1915.
William George Armstrong / Lord Armstrong (hence Armstrong Road in Benwell) started up munitions production after 1850, which created the demand for the terraced housing in Benwell
Joseph Swan established the world's first electric light bulb factory in Benwell in 1881. The factory supplied the lights for Mosley Street in Newcastle which was the first street in the UK to be lit by electric light
John Buddle was a local mining engineer, who invented and developed the means of mining coal deeply and thereby began the industrial development of the area in the early 19th century. He is commemorated in "Buddle Road". He is buried in a family crypt in the graveyard of St James' Church; for which he donated 3/4 acres for its building and was principal in having the church built. The crypt is constructed in a seam of coal, the very ore he dedicated his life to.
Richard Scot, the son of John Scot, bounded  of land to make a deer park. This has been attributed as the origin of Scotswood 
Bill Steel,  TV & Radio presenter,  actor,  broadcast journalist, lived in Benwell as a boy at 170 Atkinson Road with his parents & brother & sister
Alan Hull, a musician, songwriter, and member of Lindisfarne, was born in Benwell.
Robert Thomas Atkinson was a successful mining engineer who owned High Cross House, that once stood around the current area of Elswick Road and the corners of Maria St., Caroline St. and St John's Road. Hence the origin of "Atkinson Road". He was the nephew of John Buddle and took over many of his positions upon the death of Buddle.  He too is buried in the family crypt at St James' Church.  He died only two years after the death of John Buddle. He had donated further land for the expansion of the church graveyard.
The Reverend William Maughan was the first incumbent vicar of St James' Church, he was the vicar from 1843 - 1877.  He is buried in the church graveyard with his wife Mary. Mary was the wife of Robert Thomas Atkinson and upon his death married William.
William Surtees had Benwell Hall built. He was the brother of Bessie Surtees (made famous by her elopement with John Scott, 1st Earl of Eldon).  The Hall was demolished in 1982.
William August Fisher was born in Benwell to Russian parents in 1903, and lived at 142 Clara Street. Using the name Rudolf Abel he was arrested in New York in 1957 as a Soviet spy and was the person exchanged for Gary Powers, the pilot in the U2 bomber incident, in 1962.

References

External links
National statistics ward info
Newcastle council ward info

Districts of Newcastle upon Tyne